Events in the year 1926 in Portugal.

Incumbents
President: Bernardino Machado (until 31 May), José Mendes Cabeçadas (from 31 May to 17 June), Manuel de Oliveira Gomes da Costa (from 19 June to 9 July), Óscar Carmona (from 9 July)
Prime Minister: António Maria da Silva (until 30 May), José Mendes Cabeçadas (from 20 May to 17 June), Manuel de Oliveira Gomes da Costa (17 June to 9 July), Óscar Carmona (from 9 July)

Events
Establishment of the Portuguese Bar Association
28 May - Coup d'état, establishment of the Ditadura Nacional
31 August - 1926 Horta earthquake

Sport
Establishment of F.C. Porto (basketball)
Establishment of Sporting Clube Lourinhanense
Establishment of SC Mirandela
6 June - Campeonato de Portugal Final
1 July - Establishment of S.C. Campomaiorense
4 October - Establishment of A.C. Arrentela
19 November - Establishment of Anadia FC

Births
18 October - Martinho (Carlos Martinho Gomes), former Portuguese footballer

References

 
Portugal
Years of the 20th century in Portugal
Portugal